Klaus Kærgaard (born 21 October 1976) is a retired Danish professional football, who most notably won the 2000 Danish Cup with Viborg FF. He was a forward for Danish clubs Viborg FF and FC Midtjylland. From 1998 to 2007, Kærgård played a combined total 171 games and scored 38 goals in the Danish Superliga championship for the two teams. He ended his career prematurely in 2007, due to injuries.

Career statistics

Club

Honours

Viborg FF
 Danish Cup: 1999–2000
 Danish Super Cup: 2000

References

External links

1976 births
Living people
Danish men's footballers
Viborg FF players
FC Midtjylland players
Association football forwards
People from Holstebro
Sportspeople from the Central Denmark Region